The southern resident orcas, also known as the southern resident killer whales (SRKW), are the smallest of four separate, non-interbreeding communities  of the exclusively fish-eating ecotype of orca in the northeast portion of the North Pacific Ocean. The fish-eating ecotype was historically given the name 'resident,' but other ecotypes are also resident in the area. The U.S. National Marine Fisheries Service listed this distinct population segment of orcas as endangered, effective from 2005, under the Endangered Species Act.
In Canada the SRKW are listed as endangered on Species at Risk Act Schedule 1. 
They are commonly referred to as "fish-eating orcas", "southern residents", or the "SRKW population". Unlike some other resident communities, the SRKW is only one clan (J) that consists of 3 pods (J, K, L) with several matrilines within each pod. As of July 2022 there were only 73 individuals (74 including the captive southern resident, Lolita) in the annual census conducted by the Center for Whale Research. The world's oldest known orca, Granny or J2, had belonged to and led J pod of the SRKW population. J2 was estimated to have been born around 1911, which would mean she would have been 105 years old at the time of her disappearance and death which occurred probably in late 2016. On July 24, 2018, the first calf born in three years died after being alive for only half an hour.

Social structure
All groupings in southern resident society are essentially friendly. The basic social unit is the matriline. A matriline is formed by a matriarch and all her descendants of all generations. A number of matrilines form a southern resident pod, which is ongoing and stable in membership, and has its own dialect which is stable over time. A southern resident calf is born into the pod of their mother and remains in it for life. The southern resident pod is their normal traveling unit. The three southern resident pods form the single clan of this small killer whale community. The clan is possibly a single lineage that split into pods in the past. The clan has a unique stable dialect that shares no calls with other killer whale clans.

The following is a listing of southern resident social units:

Community
 Southern Resident orca community
Clans
 J Clan
Pods
 J Pod (25 members)
 K Pod (16 members)
 L Pod (32 members)
Matrilines
Note that in several matrilines the matriarch is absent because deceased; nonetheless her descendants continue to associate as a group. Year of survey is 2022.

J11s: J27, J31, J39, J56

J14s: J37, J40, J45, J49, J59

J16s: J16, J26, J36, J42

J17s: J35, J44, J46, J47, J53, J57

J19s: J19, J41, J51, J58

J22s: J22, J38

K12s: K12, K22, K33, K37, K43

K13s: K20, K27, K34, K38, K45

K14s: K14, K26, K36, K42

K16s: K16, K35

L4s: L55, L82, L86, L103, L106, L109, L116, L118, L123, L125

L11s: L77, L94, L113, L119, L121, L124

L22s: L22, L85 (1st cousin), L87 (brother)

L25: L25 the oldest southern resident has no surviving close relatives except probably the captive southern resident Tokitae aka Lolita. L25 travels with the L22s and L11s.

L47s: L83, L91, L110, L115, L122

L54s: L54, L108, L117, plus the unrelated L88 who is an adult male born in 1993 with no living close relatives and who always travels with the L54s.

L72s: L72, L105

L90: L90 is an adult female born 1993 who has no living close relatives. She associates with the L47s.

While J Pod always travels as a unit, and so does K Pod, L Pod orcas are usually encountered in two separate regular units traveling apart. The L4s, L47s, L90, and L72s are one consistent group; the L11s, L22s, L25, and L54s are the other; but sometimes the four L54s strikingly travel independently of all the others. The part of L Pod containing the L11s is often referred to as the L12s after long-lived matriarch L12 Alexis, who died in 2012 after outliving L11 Squirty. L11 had been estimated by association to be L12's daughter, although her birth took place many years before research began.

Recent births and deaths 
In 2014, L120 was born into L pod but didn't survive more than a month. In late 2014, J50 Scarlet was born into the J pod. After a lot of speculation, J16 Slick was confirmed to be J50's mother, making the 42-year-old the oldest ever recorded orca mother. The gender of the calf is confirmed to be female.

In February 2015, two new calves were spotted, a male calf in J pod, designated J51 Nova, and another male in L pod, designated L121 Windsong. J51's mother is ten-year-old J41 Eclipse and L121's mother is twenty-year-old L94 Calypso. A fourth calf, designated J52 was born in March 2015 to J36 Alki, who is J16's daughter.  In early 2016, J52 Sonic was confirmed to be male, however he died in September 2017, presumably from starvation. 

In August 2018, the pod attracted international attention after the death of a female calf born to J35 Tahlequah and the sickness and death of another calf, J50.

In January 2019, L124 Whistle was born to L77 Matia and is her third calf. In May 2019, J56 Tofino was born to J31 Tsuchi as her first calf and her gender was later confirmed as female.

In September 2020, J57 Phoenix was first seen traveling with J35 Tahlequah and is her second calf. His gender was determined as male a short time later. On September 24, 2020, J58 Crescent's birth was observed and she was confirmed as the second calf of J41 Eclipse by the Center for Whale Research the next day. Her gender was later confirmed as female by the Center for Whale Research.

In 2021, there was only one birth, L125 Element to L86 Surprise!. L125 is L86's second living offspring, and a female. She was first encountered in February, when her size indicated she was about a month old.

In February 2022, J37 Hy'Shqa was seen with a new calf, designated J59. This is J37's second surviving calf. The calf's gender was revealed to be female on May 29, 2022.

In April 2022, K20 Spock was seen with a new calf, designated K45. This is K20's second calf, and the first calf born in K Pod since 2011. K45 was identified as female by Fisheries and Oceans Canada in October 2022, and given the name Prosper by The Whale Museum in November 2022.

Only two calves were born in 2022, and the total population of the Southern Residents has fallen to one of its lowest numbers since 1974, when 71 individuals were counted following the live-capture era. Only 73 Southern Residents were counted in the July 1, 2022 census conducted by the Center for Whale Research. This consisted of 32 whales in L Pod, its lowest point since 1976, 16 orcas in K Pod, its lowest in the last 20 years, and 25 in J Pod, which remained stable. In the year up to July 2022, three individuals died: K21, K44, and L89. From 1998 to 2022, 46 southern resident orca calves have been born and survived, while 81 southern residents have died.

Sounds
Southern resident killer whale vocal production is classified in three categories: clicks, whistles, and pulsed calls.

Clicks made by toothed whales are very brief vocal sounds produced in rapid series for echolocation.

"Whistles are non-pulsed continuous signals with much simpler harmonic structure" than pulsed calls. Whistling is a minor component of southern resident killer whale vocalizations, "whereas whistles are the primary social vocalization among the majority of Delphinidae species."

Killer whale pulsed calls may sound to humans like forms of speech, music, or wordless squeals, "with distinct tonal qualities and harmonic structure. These calls, typically 0.5–1.5 s in duration, are the primary social vocalization of killer whales." "By varying the timbre and frequency structure of the calls, the whales can generate a variety of signals." "Most calls contain sudden shifts or rapid sweeps in pitch, which give them distinctive qualities recognizable over distance and background noise."

Dialect
Cetacean cultures are marked by socially-determined vocal traditions. Toothed whales, including killer whales, are known for large brains and complex social structure with correspondingly complex vocal communication systems.

Some vocalizations produced by southern residents are unrepeated, but the majority are repetitions of the same calls that have been produced for many years in that social group. These distinct and traditional calls are referred to as discrete, or stereotyped calls. Each southern resident pod's set of discrete calls is their dialect. 

The three southern resident pods share some calls with one another, and also have unique calls. Together, the three pods form a clan, J-Clan. Clans share no calls with other clans. Thus the three clans of northern resident orcas and the single southern resident clan share no calls.

Among killer whales born and observed in captivity, calves at first babbled without making the discrete calls of adults. The calves gradually began to make the calls their mother made, but never made the calls of other, unrelated whales. In the wild, juvenile southern residents use only their matrilineal pod's dialect, including a limited number of vocalizations shared with other pods. Southern residents do not make the calls particular to a different pod's dialect even though southern resident pods frequently mix with the other pods in the clan and the whales could in theory learn the other pods' calls. "It may well be that dialects are used by the whales as acoustic indicators of group identity and membership, which might serve to preserve the integrity and cohesiveness of the social unit."

Identifying calls and whistles
Discrete killer whale calls "can be readily identified by the trained ear or sound analyzer—some dialects are so distinctive that even an inexperienced listener can immediately discern the differences."

"J-Clan discrete calls were classified alphanumerically" by John Ford "with the letter “S” preceding the number to indicate that it is from a Southern Resident (S1, S2, etc.). All three pods share some calls in common, while other calls are produced by only a single pod," or by K Pod and only one of the other two pods. For example, the S42 is one of three pulsed calls produced in all three pods, whereas the S17 is not produced in J Pod. It is unsurprising and perhaps genealogically significant that it is K Pod that 'pairs' with the other two pods, while J Pod and L Pod are vocally far apart.

Because it is unique to a particular group of whales, a dialect makes it possible to identify which whales are present from acoustic evidence without visual detection. At the Center for Whale Research, Ken Balcomb identified which pods were passing from their pulsed calls relayed by distant hydrophones.

The most common call for identifying each pod is:

S1: J Pod, also produced in K Pod

S16: K Pod, also produced in L Pod

S2iii: L12s

S19: rest of L Pod

Vocal divergence between the two parts of L Pod supports the idea that L Pod may actually (almost?) be two pods.

While whistles are rarer than pulsed calls among southern resident killer whales, many are also stereotyped and form part of their dialects. Southern resident killer whale stereotyped whistles have been given "a similar alphanumeric designation (SW1, SW2, etc.)."

Meaning in vocalizations
What do the vocalizations mean?

"Different calls do not appear to be given in sequences that resemble a syntax, such as in human languages." Early research found that most sequences of calls included the same call being repeated at least five times. This would not occur if the calls were letters or words in a syntactical language.

In the example of the northern resident orcas, shared discrete calls are not necessary for social interactions, as the three clans in this community mix without sharing any discrete calls in their dialects. On the other hand, as markers of group identity, unique discrete calls would help matriarchs keep track of their pod mates when navigating or mixing with other pods in murky waters. The discrete calls "appear to serve generally as contact signals, coordinating group behaviour and keeping pod members in touch when they are out of sight of each other."

Researchers have been unable to find a consistent correlation of specific calls with specific behaviors. Alexandra Morton's observations of the captured northern residents Corky and Orky found a different kind of correlation, a finding supported by observers of orcas in the wild. The pair of killer whales repetitively called in "long 'conversations' while floating side by side" without engaging in any behaviors requiring the exchange of any information. Morton found, nonetheless, an association of some calls with particular moods, or shifts in mood.

Ken Balcomb spoke with Carl Safina about the issues:

Spectrograms do depict subtle differences among instances of discrete calls, which might communicate emotional state and current behavior.

Not all vocalizations are repetitive and discrete. When closely socializing, for example, the "whales employ a wide range of highly variable" vocalizations.

A particular way of socializing among southern resident pods is a behaviour referred to as a "greeting ceremony." After less than a minute, the two groups then submerge and a great deal of social excitement and vocal activity ensues as they swim and mill together in tight subgroups."

Excitement sound
In the SRKW catalog, one call, the S10, has come to be viewed in a different light to the others. Shared by all three pods and common in multi-pod aggregations such as superpods, the S10, with a duration of several seconds, has been likened to human laughter by many listeners over the years.

A 2011 study compared sixty-nine calls in tests in which the nine listeners were blind to the sources of the calls. The samples were drawn from multiple North Pacific clans. The results categorized the S10 in a group of calls that showed some variations but seemed associated. The researchers concluded that, with minor variation, this was one call that crossed the cultures of clans and even ecotypes, and was not acquired through social learning like the rest of the repertoire. They identified it as being an 'excitement' call "associated with arousal behaviours" of various kinds. Recordings of this 'excitement call' included northern as well as southern residents, and also Gulf of Alaska transients, who produce it in characteristic celebrations after a kill. Each ecotype's behavior may be different, but the happy emotional state of excitement is common to both behaviors.

Moby Doll

A southern resident initiated the scientific study of killer whale sounds. When the juvenile J Pod member later named Moby Doll was captured in 1964, it was a watershed for the then very misunderstood and hated species. He began the transformation of the species' public image, and made possible the first closeup studies of a live killer whale.

Killer whales had been recorded in the field five times; three of the recordings had been of J Pod. J Pod had been recorded in Dabob Bay on October 20, 1960, by US Navy personnel; and in Saanich Inlet by Canada's Defence Research Establishment Pacific on February 19, 1958, and in Spring, 1961. These historical field recordings would ultimately provide a suggestive reference for the stability in time of discrete calls.

Harold Dean Fisher recorded Moby Doll at Burrard Dry Dock, and the tape he kept at UBC would years later have great significance for pivotal researcher John Ford (see below), who heard it as a student.

Schevill and Watkins' study of Moby Doll created the fundamental basis for understanding killer whale sounds.

William E. Schevill first heard the underwater sounds of whales during World War II, in the fight against U-boats. He was inspired to become a cetologist and pioneer in the study of whale sounds. He had already studied 20 other species of cetacean when in August 1964 he travelled to Vancouver with his Woods Hole Oceanographic Institution colleague William A. Watkins to study Moby Doll for three days.

At Moby Doll's seapen at Jericho Beach the scientists found an acoustically exceptional site for their work. Following Donald Griffin's pioneering work with bats, Schevill had been the first to describe echolocation in whales. The little southern resident gave him proof that killer whales were among its users. Schevill also found that Moby Doll did not use it continually, but was content to use only his memory or eyesight if they sufficed. The scientists  demonstrated the sharp, directional nature of his echolocation, giving support to Kenneth Norris's new hypothesis that the fatty melon of a delphinid might function as an acoustic lens. The killer whale's clicks were narrower-band and lower-frequency than those of other delphinids.

Schevill and Watkins examined killer whale pulsed calls for the first time, too. They labeled them "screams." Moby Doll never produced the "whistle-like squeal" of other delphinids. Rather, these 'screams' were produced in the same way as echolocation, but in pulses of clicks at a much faster repetition-rate, with the strong harmonic structure masking the individuality of the clicks. Moreover, whereas other delphinids could produce clicks and whistles concurrently, Moby Doll never produced clicks and pulsed calls simultaneously, which was supporting evidence that both of his types of sound were produced by the same mechanism. (In later research, however, John Ford did find some whistling to be a minor component of southern resident vocalizations, "whereas whistles are the primary social vocalization among the majority of Delphinidae species.") The scientists noted that there was much variation in their recordings, but certain patterns were general. The pulses had a "strident" quality due to their harmonic structure, with many strong harmonics, and they were much louder than the echolocation. Moby Doll was able to change the frequency and harmonics in the pulses and vary the signals.

John K.B. Ford actually saw Moby Doll the day the captured orca was on display at Burrard Dry Dock. Ford was nine at the time. While he was studying science at UBC, he recorded whale sounds. He heard zoology professor H.D. Fisher's tape of Moby Doll at Burrard Dry Dock. "These calls were burnt into my acoustic memory," Ford said when interviewed by Mark Leiren-Young. In time, the calls would make it possible for Ford to posthumously identify that Moby Doll had come from J Pod.

In 1978, Ford began making the recordings of killer whales in British Columbia that he would use for his Ph. D. thesis. After starting with northern residents, in the fall he traveled to the mouth of the Fraser River to make his first recordings of southern residents.

"I put the hydrophone on the side of the boat, and I was recording the sounds, and they all sounded pretty alien to me, because the dialects are very different from the northern residents, which I had started becoming familiar with, and then, all of the sudden, in the middle of these calls, is the one I remembered so vividly from the Moby Doll tapes. I realized, in that moment, that this was the pod Moby Doll must have come from. It was J pod." What Ford was hearing was a scientific breakthrough in the study of mammals: it was evidence of an acoustic culture unique to a single pod which outlived an individual mammal. "It was a wonderful moment out there in the boat when I recognized the sounds coming from J pod to be Moby Doll’s signature sounds."

Location 
The southern residents have been seen off the coast of California, Oregon, Washington, and Vancouver Island, British Columbia. Historic sightings  and more recent data from satellite-tagged individuals show frequent use of coastal waters as far south as Monterey Bay, California in the winter and early spring. Members of L pod have been seen as far north as southeast Alaska. During the late spring through fall, the southern residents tend to travel around the inland waterways of Puget Sound, the Strait of Juan de Fuca, and southern Georgia Strait - an area known as the Salish Sea. More information is now available about their range and movements during the winter months, which appears to follow the return of Chinook salmon to major rivers in California and North America's Pacific Northwest region.

Relationship with the Lummi Nation 
The Lummi Nation has had a relationship with southern resident killer whales in the Salish Sea for thousands of years. Early proof of this can be seen in the recorded oral tradition of the tribes in the Puget Sound with the story "The Two Brothers' Journey to the North", which was first recorded in the mid-1850s. The Lummi Nation refer to the southern resident killer whales as qwe'lhol'mechen, which translates to "people beneath the waves". The term Sk'aliCh'elh is used to refer to the J, K, and L pods of the Southern Resident orcas by their "Lummi family name". The Lummi Nation considers the southern resident killer whales as kin and has sacred ceremonies dedicated to them.

Due to pollution, lack of prey, and previous whaling efforts, the orcas’ populations have recently been in decline. The Lummi have been making efforts using Traditional Ecological Knowledge (TEK) to support the orca population. They are concerned about the future of the orcas if environmental issues that negatively impact the orcas continue to persist, and have been seeking support from agencies with the government to work harder in upholding the integrity of orca populations.

J17, or Princess Angeline, is one such orca that has been under the care of the Lummi people in recent years. Before J17 passed away in 2019, the Lummi people practiced orca feeding ceremonies with J17. The ceremony for the spiritual feeding involves first leaving the mainland on a boat to find a proper location. Next is the releasing of live and dead salmon, the live salmon to feed J17, and the dead salmon to honor the qwe'lhol mechen ancestors. The purpose of the ceremony is to hope that the condition of the orcas improves as well as to honor the orcas' ancestors. In relation to such feedings, Lummi matriarch Raynell Morris has explained that "Here at Lummi when we see a relative starving, we don’t go in and do medical tests to see how much they are starving. We know they are and we do the right thing and we feed them."

Distinguishing features 
Dorsal fin: rounded at the tip (leading edge) and positioned over the rear insertion of the fin towards the back.
Saddle patch: typically seen as an "open" saddle patch; five different pigmentation patterns have been reported with similarities noted among clans within a community.

Diet 
Southern residents are fish-eating orcas that prefer the Chinook salmon to other fish species. From visual sources, necropsy, and feces collection, the following food preferences have been reported:
Salmon 97%
Chinook (78% in late spring and fall)
Chum (11%, more so in fall)
Coho (5%)
Steelhead (2%)
Sockeye (1%)
Other fish 3%
e.g. Pacific herring and quillback rockfish
They have occasionally been recorded playfully killing porpoises without consuming them.

Threats 
The primary, interactive threats to this very small population have been listed as:
Insufficient prey
High levels of contaminants in prey and water
Impacts and sound from vessels

Decline in prey
The depletion of large quantities of fish in the marine environments, while personal fishing in the salmon's upstream spawning grounds has continued, have further depleted stock replenishment. Aquaculture has had a negative effect on world fish supplies, including through the spread of pathogens to the wild fish stock. A study also found that Chinook salmon found in South Puget Sound have less fat than those farther north, causing an increased need for consumption. Due to four dams in the Lower Snake River Dam System, native salmon flow has been heavily restricted, endangering both Chinook Salmon and Southern Resident Killer Whales.

Chemical contamination
Northwest orca are among the most contaminated marine mammals in the world, due to the high levels of toxic anthropogenic chemicals that accumulate in their tissues. Implicated in the decline of orca populations in the Pacific Northwest, these widespread contaminants pose a large problem for conservation efforts. While many chemicals can be found in the tissues of orca, the most common are the insecticide DDT, polybrominated diphenyl ethers (PBDEs) and polychlorinated biphenyls (PCBs). Each of these have detrimental physiological effects on orca, and can be found in such high concentrations in dead individuals that those individuals must be disposed of in hazardous waste sites.

Correlative evidence shows orca may be vulnerable to effects of PCBs on many levels. Research has identified PCBs as being linked to restricting development of the reproductive system in orcas and dolphins. High contamination levels leads to low pregnancy rates and high mortality in dolphins. Further effects include endocrine and immune system disruption, both systems being critical to mammalian health and survival.  A study examining 35 Northwest orcas found key genetic alterations that caused changes to normal physiological functions. These genetic level interferences, combined with the varied effects of PCBs at other physiological levels, suggest these contaminants may be partially responsible for declines in orca populations.

Many of the chemicals that have been found to be toxic to the orca population continue to be widely used. Conservation efforts are said to have difficulty making progress if the chemicals that harm the orcas continue to pollute the water they live in.

Marine noise
Noise and crowding from tour boats and larger vessels interrupt foraging behavior, or scare away prey. The noise can mask echolocation causing difficulty with catching prey. Also, sonar is speculated to cause hemorrhaging, and possibly death.

Previous captures

Population numbers
Before the 20th century, orca populations in the Salish Sea likely numbered over 200. From 1964 to 1976, approximately 47 southern resident orcas were captured to be taken to aquariums, and possibly a dozen or more died during capture attempts. While the capture of these whales was banned in Canada in 1976, the number of whales was reduced significantly and there were only 71 remaining in the population.  Since then, the orca population in the Salish Sea has fluctuated from a low of 71 to a high of 98 in 1995 and declining again to reach the status of endangered that it holds today.

Yukon Harbor capture

The first large capture event was the Yukon Harbor capture on the west side of Puget Sound in 1967. Of the 15 trapped southern residents, three died, and five were taken into captivity. They were from K Pod, now the smallest pod.

1970 Penn Cove capture

On a single day in 1970 in Penn Cove off Whidbey Island in Washington state, approximately 80 orcas were herded into net pens and 7 young orcas were captured to be placed in aquariums and theme parks. The orca commonly known as Tokitae, or as Sk’aliCh’elh-tenaut to the Lummi, was captured during this event, and is the only orca from the event still alive in captivity, at the Miami Seaquarium.

Conservation efforts

United States
Both NOAA and the Lummi Nation have been making efforts to feed bolster the Southern Resident population, however, there is disagreement in the types of conservation efforts that should be implemented. The Lummi believe that immediate action is necessary in order to sustain the already unhealthy orca populations, while NOAA believes in observing before taking action. The Lummi are using "traditional ecological knowledge" practices to help sustain the orca population, including feeding of malnourished individuals, which has been criticized by NOAA as unsustainable. The groups have worked together though to create "helpful protocols" and strive for the overall wellbeing of the orcas.

Current conservation efforts are listed as:

 Support salmon restoration efforts
 Clean up existing contaminated sites
 Continue evaluating and improving guidelines for vessel activity
 Prevent oil spills
 Continue Agency coordination
 Enhance public awareness
 Improve responses to live and dead orcas
 Coordinate monitoring, research, enforcement
 Conduct research
 Cooperation and coordination

Washington state
There was a Washington state-wide task force created in March 2018 to make recommendations on how to preserve the Southern Residents from extinction. Some of the recommendations include stopping the use of hormone disruptors and other toxins in consumer products and removing dams that interfere with the salmon's access to breeding grounds.

The city council of Port Townsend issued a non-binding resolution in 2022 declaring that the Southern resident orcas have rights of nature and should be protected due to the orca's significant "cultural, spiritual, and economic" value to the state and its citizens.

Canada
On October 31, 2018, the Government of Canada committed $61.5 million to implement new protections for the Southern Residents.

See also 
 Northern resident killer whale
 List of cetaceans
 Michael Bigg
 Orca types and populations

References

General references

External links 
 The Center for Whale Research
 Orca Network Learning Center Portal
 Sounds of Southern Resident Orcas portal
 Puget Sound Orcas Vital Sign indicator: Number of Southern Resident Killer Whales
 Orca Behavior Institute
 Orcas of the Pacific Northwest are starving and disappearing, The New York Times, 9 July 2018
Early recordings of orcas, and those of Moby Doll, can be found online in the Woods Hole Oceanographic Institution's "Watkins Marine Mammal Sound Database." Additional sound cuts of Moby Doll dated 17 July 1964 can be found there on an "All Cuts" page.

 
Endemic fauna of the Pacific Northwest
Orcas
Cetaceans of the Pacific Ocean
Puget Sound
ESA endangered species
Animal communication
Whale sounds
Cetology
Cetacean research and conservation
Marine biology
Independent research institutes